Liu Yinqing (born 15 September 1974) is a Chinese fencer. She won a bronze medal in the women's team épée event at the 2000 Summer Olympics.

References

1974 births
Living people
Chinese female fencers
Olympic fencers of China
Fencers at the 2000 Summer Olympics
Olympic bronze medalists for China
Olympic medalists in fencing
Medalists at the 2000 Summer Olympics